Jards Anet da Silva (Rio de Janeiro, March 3, 1943), known as Macalé, is a Brazilian composer, singer and actor, known for his influential role in Brazil's tropicália movement in the 1960s.

Background

Jards Macalé was born in Rio de Janeiro, in the neighborhood of Tijuca, near Morro da Formiga, surrounded by music: on the hills, the drums; in the neighborhood, Vicente Celestino and Gilda de Abreu. At home, foxes, waltzes and folk songs played on the piano by his mother, Dona Ligia (who also sang), and the accordion by his father. The family choir had his younger brother, Roberto, and Jards. On the radio, Orlando Silva, Emilinha Borba.

As a boy, he moved to Ipanema, where he earned the nickname "Macalé" - who was the worst football player in the Botafogo team at that time. As a teenager, he formed his first musical group - the duo "Dois no Balanço"; later came "Conjunto Fantasia de Garoto", which played jazz, seranade and "samba canção".

He studied piano and orchestration with Guerra Peixe, cello with Peter Dauelsberg, guitar with Turibio Santos and Jodacil Damasceno, and musical analysis with Esther Scliar.

His professional career began in 1965 as a guitarist in "Grupo Opinião". He was musical director of the first performances of Maria Bethania. He had compositions recorded by Elizete Cardoso and Nara Leão, among others. With Gal Costa, Paulinho da Viola and his composition partner José Carlos Capinam, he created the Tropicarte Agency, to manage their shows.

In 1969, he participated in the 4th International Song Festival presenting Gotham City song, and released their first album, "Dead Only". He worked with Gal Costa in Le-Gal disk and show My name is Gal. In 1971 he went to London, invited by Caetano Veloso, with whom he performed and recorded. In the same year, back to Brazil, and released their first LP, Jards Macalé. In 1974, he released the album Learning to Swim.

He participated as an actor and composer of the soundtrack of the films of Ogun Amulet and Tent of Miracles, Nelson Pereira dos Santos. He also composed for the soundtracks of Macunaíma Joaquim Pedro de Andrade, Antonio das Mortes, Glauber Rocha, The Queen Diaba, Antonio Carlos Fontoura, if safe, trickster !, "Hugo Carvana, Getúlio Vargas, documentary by Ana Carolina, and "If safe rascal," Hugo Carvana. He also composed soundtracks for theater.

In 1976, he became Silva Moreira partner on the some sambas.

Macalé is the author of songs like Vapor Barato, Angel exterminated, Mal Secreto, the Movement Boats, Rua Real Grandeza, Highness, Star Hotel, Poem of the Rose. We had as Capinam partners, Waly Salomão, Torquato Neto, Nana Vasconcelos, Xico Chaves, Jorge Mautner, Glauber Rocha and even Abel Silva, Vinicius de Morais, Fausto Nile. Among the interpreters of his songs are Gal Costa ( "Hotel of the Stars" and "cheap Steam"), Maria Bethania ( "exterminated Angel" and "boats Movement"), Clara Nunes ( "The more-than-perfect") Venus Shirt ( "Gotham City") and O Rappa ( "Vapor Barato"), among others.

Although he's also collaborated with the likes of Gilberto Gil and Caetano Veloso, he has since walked away from these partnerships, claiming that tropicalism as a movement has been co-opted by the culture industry, losing its artistic independence.

In 1985, he participated in the musical Sands Body Heat.

In 2012, participated in collaboration with the band Dorgas series Meet The Legends, the company of dark-glasses Ray-Ban, where she sang the song "Golden Pheasant (Trend and Color)" from the band's original authorship.

In 2013 he participated in Exile Songs event, which claimed to be anarchist, and Tenda dos Milagres.

In 2019, his album Besta Fera was nominated for the Latin Grammy Award for Best MPB Album and considered one of the 25 best Brazilian albums of the first half of 2019 by the São Paulo Association of Art Critics.

Discography
Contributing artist
 Unwired: Latin America (2001, World Music Network)
 Unwired: Besta Fera (2018, Pommelo)

References

External links
 Brazil's Secret Musical Weapon: Jards Macalé
 

1943 births
Living people
Brazilian composers